Pentad ('group of 5') or pentade may refer to:

Pentad (chord), a five-note chord
Pentad (computing), or pentade, a 5-bit group
a division of the solar term
Dramatistic pentad, Kenneth Burke's method of analyzing motivation
Medical pentad, a group of five signs or symptoms which characterise a specific medical condition
a tuple of length 5

See also
 5
 Quintet (disambiguation)
 Tetrad (disambiguation) ('group of 4')
 Hexad (disambiguation) ('group of 6')
 Lustrum, a five-year period in Ancient Rome.
 Pentadic numerals
 p-adic number
 Quinary